Hayaquq-e Nabi Rural District is a rural district (dehestan) in the Central District of Tuyserkan County, Hamadan Province, Iran. At the 2006 census, its population was 15,699, in 4,139 families. The rural district has 22 villages.

References 

Rural Districts of Hamadan Province
Tuyserkan County